The Channa barb (Eechathalakenda ophicephalus) (formerly Puntius ophicephalus), is a species of cyprinid fish endemic to India where it occurs in hill streams in forested areas. This species can reach a length of  TL. This species is also found in the aquarium trade. This species is the only member of its genus.

References 

Cyprininae
Fish described in 1941